The Order of the Golden Bear (the Order, OGB) is a prominent honor society at the University of California, Berkeley composed of students, faculty, and alumni committed to serving the University of California. Founded in 1900, the Order serves as a forum for discussion, where fellows gather to exchange ideas on a variety of topics pertinent to the well-being of the campus community. Fellows are free to discuss ideas amongst themselves, but never to attribute opinions or remarks to their authors.

Despite its mystique, the Order is not a traditional secret society per se, although membership is usually kept in strict confidence, and many of its traditions rival those of typical collegiate secret societies. Membership in the Order includes influential members of the University administration, California government, and the Board of Regents. When it was founded, student membership was limited to undergraduate senior men; in 1972, this restriction was lifted and all students, with at least sophomore standing, have been eligible for fellowship. In its earliest years, and through members like Robert Gordon Sproul, John McCone, and Clark Kerr, the Order was commonly associated with the Bohemian and California Clubs.

Since 1906, the Order has been housed in Senior Hall, a log cabin on the Berkeley campus designed by John Galen Howard. In recent years, however, the Order has been forced to relocate due to building closures. Every fall semester, the Order hosts one event open to the general public during Homecoming weekend called the  Arleigh Williams Forum, either featuring a prominent speaker or a panel of engaged student and faculty to discuss campus issues.

Notable members 
The Order's fellows have included:
 Charles Mills Gayley, English and Classics Professor, and Academic Dean of the University of California (1889-1932). 
 Phoebe Apperson Hearst, philanthropist and first female UC Regent, granted honorary Order membership due to her donation to Senior Hall.
 Robert Gordon Sproul, President of the University of California, Berkeley (1930–1952) and President of the University of California (1952–1958).
 John A. McCone, Director of the CIA during the height of the Cold War (1961-1965); assisted the FBI in blacklisting Clark Kerr.
 Walter A. Haas, President of Levi Strauss & Co.
 Benjamin Ide Wheeler, President of the University of California, Berkeley (1899–1919).
 Arleigh Williams, Cal football player (1932-1934) and University administrator (1957-1976).
 Lynn O. "Pappy" Waldorf, head football coach for the California Golden Bears (1947-1956).
 Glenn T. Seaborg, Nobel laureate in chemistry and Chancellor of the University of California, Berkeley (1958-1961).
 Clark Kerr, Chancellor of the University of California, Berkeley and President of the University of California (1958–1967).
 William Knowland, United States Senator from California (1945–1959) and Senate Majority Leader (1953–1955).
 Zoë Baird, President of the Markle Foundation.
 Robert McNamara, the 8th United States Secretary of Defense (1961–1968) and President of the World Bank Group (1968–1981).
 Leigh Steinberg, American sports agent.
 Carol T. Christ, first female Chancellor of the University of California, Berkeley (2017–present).
 John Pérez, Chair of the Regents of the University of California (2019–present).

See also
 Florida Blue Key
 The Machine
 Gridiron Secret Society
 Friar Society

References

External links 
 Magazine reference
 Order of the Golden Bear website

University of California, Berkeley
Collegiate secret societies
Student organizations established in 1900